Antonia Quirke is a British film critic. As well as writing on film for the Financial Times and a weekly column for the New Statesman, she has presented regularly on The Film Programme, Pick of the Week, BBC Radio 4, as well as Film... and The One Show on BBC One.

Quirke attended, in her words, a "doughty northern convent school". She has a degree in English literature from University College London.

Quirke participated in the 2012 Sight & Sound critics' poll, where she listed her ten favourite films as follows: The Deer Hunter, Going Places, Jaws, King Kong, Nosferatu, On the Waterfront, Rear Window, Reds, This Is Spinal Tap, and A Woman Is a Woman.

Publications
Jaws (2002)
Madame Depardieu and the Beautiful Strangers (2007)
Choking on Marlon Brando: A Film Critic's Memoir About Love and the Movies (2007)

References

External links

Living people
Alumni of University College London
British film critics
New Statesman people
British women film critics
Year of birth missing (living people)